The Innerste Dam  is a dam on the Innerste river, which lies near Langelsheim and Wolfshagen in the Harz mountains. It was built between 1963 and 1966 and belongs to the Harzwasserwerke. Its purposes are the supply of drinking water, flood protection, water flow  regulation and hydroelectric power generation. The average annual discharge through the Innerste Dam is 60 million m³.

Structures 
The Innerste is an earth-fill dam with multiple, external, asphaltic concrete layers. It has an inspection gangway along its whole length on the upstream apron. In front of the upstream base of the dam is a shaft spillway (a flood overflow tower), into which also the bottom outlet is integrated. The water of the Innerste Dam can be pumped via a 4.6 km long diversion channel to the Grane Dam further east, where it can be used for water treatment. From 2003 to 2005 the reservoir was completely emptied and renovated, especially the asphalt sealing and the bottom outlet. This work was finished in September 2005.

Flood control 
Because the reservoir only has a limited flood control capacity (i.e. its capacity is relatively small in relation to the annual discharge), it can only check flooding within certain limits. The flood relief facility (spillway) is used about every two years. Nevertheless, even when the Innerste Dam overflows, the level of retention significantly reduces and delays flooding.

Recreation 
The reservoir may be used by sailing and rowing boats and for angling and camping. The Innerste Valley Railway is an old railway line, that had a halt by the Innerste Dam.

Gallery

See also 
 List of dams in the Harz
 List of reservoirs and dams in Germany

Sources

External links 

 Harzwasserwerke.de with a link to current dam data
 Innerste Dam in the Online Harz Travel Guide

Dams in Lower Saxony
Dams in the Harz
Earth-filled dams
Dams completed in 1966